"In the Land of the Buffalo" is a popular song, first published in 1907. The chorus:
In the land of the Buffalo,
Where the Western breezes blow,
Where the goodnight kiss of the sunlight
Sets all the plains aglow.
It was there you discovered your Flo,
In the days of long ago.
But you never knew brother Lew loved her too,
In the land of the Buffalo.

It was recorded by many popular artists of the time, including Billy Murray on Edison Records. Billy Murray's version can also be found at several websites, as it has entered the public domain.

See also
1907 in music
Edison Records

External links
 Website with public domain version of the song by Billy Murray

1907 songs
Billy Murray (singer) songs
Songs with music by Egbert Van Alstyne
Songs with lyrics by Harry Williams (songwriter)